Mitochondrial transcription factor A, abbreviated as TFAM or mtTFA, is a protein that in humans is encoded by the TFAM gene.

Function 

This gene encodes a mitochondrial transcription factor that is a key activator of mitochondrial transcription as well as a participant in mitochondrial genome replication. TFAM binds mitochondrial promoter DNA to aid transcription of the mitochondrial genome. Studies in mice have demonstrated that this gene product is required to regulate the mitochondrial genome copy number and is essential for embryonic development. A mouse model for Kearns–Sayre syndrome was produced when expression of this gene was eliminated by targeted disruption in heart and muscle cells.

TFAM is a double box High-mobility group DNA-binding and bending protein. This bending action is important for mitochondrial transcription initiation in mammals, but not in yeasts with the homolog Abf2. TFAM may also participate in the packaging of the mitochondrial genome, as its binding activity is non-sequence-specific.

Interactions 

TFAM has been shown to interact with TFB1M and TFB2M.

References

Further reading

External links